"The Grey Nurse Said Nothing" is a television play written by Sumner Locke Elliott. It was based on elements of the Shark Arm case but is mostly fictitious. The play was screened in the US in 1959 as an episode of Playhouse 90. It was performed on American and Australian television.

Plot
A shark is captured and throws up an identifiable human arm, with a tattoo. It is presumed the arm belongs to a boatman. A local tycoon is arrested for murder.

Witnesses at the trial include the tycoon's alcoholic wife, whom the boatman tried to seduce, and a local school teacher in love with the boatman.

Cast
Ann Todd as Laura Mills
Angela Lansbury as Hazel Wills
Paul Comi as Patrick Aherne
Gary Crutcher as Lynch mob leader
Patricia Cutts as Mavis Greenop
Michael David as Herbert Wills
Don Dubbins as Bluey
Hugh Griffith as Rev. Light
Tony Haig as Boy

Production
The play was set in Australia, a location that was uncommon on American TV at the time.

The show had a cast of 120. Sumner Locke Elliot provided the sounds of a Kookaburra because none were available; he imitated one in the studio.

Reception
The Los Angeles Times called it a "suspenseful telecast" in which the cast "gave universally good performances."

The Chicago Daily Tribune called it "thoroughly enjoyable".

References

External links
 

1959 American television episodes
1959 television plays
Playhouse 90 (season 4) episodes